Kirill Kirilenko (born 8 October 2000) is a Belarusian professional footballer who plays for FC Brașov.

Personal life
Kirilenko is of Ukrainian descent.

Honours
Dinamo Brest
Belarusian Cup winner: 2017–18

BATE Borisov
Belarusian Cup winner: 2019–20

References

External links 
 
 

2000 births
Living people
Belarusian people of Ukrainian descent
Belarusian footballers
Association football forwards
Belarusian expatriate footballers
Expatriate footballers in Ukraine
Expatriate footballers in Romania
Belarusian expatriate sportspeople in Ukraine
FC Minsk players
FC Dynamo Brest players
FC BATE Borisov players
FC Karpaty Lviv players
FC Olimpik Donetsk players
FC Torpedo-BelAZ Zhodino players
FC Brașov (2021) players
Ukrainian Premier League players
Footballers from Minsk